Lonnie Elonzo Glosson (born Lonnie Marvin Glosson February 14, 1908 – March 2, 2001) was an American country musician, songwriter, and radio personality who was responsible for popularizing the harmonica on a national level. Glosson is known for his versatility as a live performer, both as a soloist and a group member, and for a radio career spanning nearly seven decades.

Biography

Glosson was born the seventh child of George and Cora Glosson in Judsonia, Arkansas. He changed his middle name to Elonzo because he disliked his uncle he was named after. Originally working as a cotton picker, Glosson was taught the rudiments of the harmonica by his mother before beginning his professional musical career in 1925, on KMOX Radio, in St. Louis. Glosson traveled around the Midwest for performances in small-time venues before auditioning as a cast member for WLS Chicago's National Barn Dance in 1930, alongside many other musical acts, including Gene Autry, who attempted to persuade Glosson to pursue an acting career with him, in Hollywood. Instead, Glosson remained in Chicago to join the WJJD Suppertime Frolic programming. He managed to become a popular local attraction for his ability to include unusually harmonic riffs and sounds in his stage act.

Glosson did eventually go to Hollywood to accept an opening as a radio host in 1934, but returned to the Midwest by the end of the year. In 1936, while being a featured performer on Renfro Valley Barn Dance, Glosson recorded his self-penned song "Arkansas Hard Luck Blues", which was highlighted by an early example of talking blues, a style later popularized by Bob Dylan. Also in the year, Glosson began a long-standing partnership with fellow musician Wayne Raney, fueled by Raney's admiration for Glosson's harmonica techniques, and establishing the team on a radio station in Little Rock. In the early 1940s, Glosson composed for Molly O'Day, whom he first encountered while on Suppertime Frolic, writing songs that included "Mathew 24" and "Don't Forget the Family Prayer". In 1948, Glosson and Raney commenced their most prolific work on a nationally syndicated program centered in Cincinnati. As hosts, the duo promoted Kraft Company's harmonicas, along with various techniques and instructions. They are credited with being responsible for five million purchases, and effectively bringing the instrument to the mainstream market. In addition, the two recorded with the Delmore Brothers and were credited on the hit song "Blues Stay Away from Me" in 1949.

In 1960, Glosson and Raney's partnership ended when Raney decided to establish a recording studio for emerging rock and roll artists. Glosson initiated a solo career, mainly performing in universities and expanding into gospel music. In the 1970s, Glosson recorded on Raney's Rimrock label, and, in 1980, the duo reunited to record an album.

On March 2, 2001, at the age of 93 Glosson died of natural causes.

References

American radio personalities
American harmonica players
1908 births
2001 deaths
20th-century American musicians